The 2013 WNBA season is the 17th season for the New York Liberty of the Women's National Basketball Association. The Liberty will play at Prudential Center in New Jersey due to renovations at Madison Square Garden.

Transactions

WNBA Draft
The following are the Liberty's selections in the 2013 WNBA Draft.

Trades

Personnel changes

Additions

Subtractions

Roster

Depth

Season standings

Schedule

Preseason

|- style="background:#fcc;"
		 | 1 
		 | May 11
		 | @ Connecticut
		 | 
		 | Williams, Pierson, & Montgomery (12)
		 | Essence Carson (5)
		 | Alex Montgomery (5)
		 | Mohegan Sun Arena6692
		 | 0–1
|- style="background:#fcc;"
		 | 2 
		 | May 15
		 | @ Chicago
		 | 
		 | Pondexter & Montgomery (14)
		 | Alex Montgomery (8)
		 | Kara Braxton (4)
		 | Jacoby Dickens Center1250
		 | 0–2
|- style="background:#cfc;"
		 | 3 
		 | May 18
		 |  Connecticut
		 | 
		 | Cappie Pondexter (14)
		 | Pondexter & Bone (6)
		 | Essence Carson (5)
		 | Prudential Center1945
		 | 1–2

Regular season

|- style="background:#fcc;"
		 | 1 
		 | May 25
		 | @ Connecticut
		 | 
		 | Cappie Pondexter (23)
		 | Kara Braxton (9)
		 | Pondexter & Williams (4)
		 | Mohegan Sun Arena7672
		 | 0–1
|- style="background:#cfc;"
		 | 2 
		 | May 31
		 |  Tulsa
		 | 
		 | Essence Carson (18)
		 | Braxton & Pondexter (8)
		 | Cappie Pondexter (6)
		 | Prudential Center7532
		 | 1–1

|- style="background:#cfc;"
		 | 3 
		 | June 5
		 |  Indiana
		 | 
		 | Essence Carson (21)
		 | Braxton & Montgomery (7)
		 | Leilani Mitchell (3)
		 | Prudential Center7617
		 | 2–1
|- style="background:#fcc;"
		 | 4 
		 | June 7
		 | @ Atlanta
		 | 
		 | Kara Braxton (14)
		 | Alex Montgomery (12)
		 | Pierson & Montgomery (4)
		 | Philips Arena6173
		 | 2–2
|- style="background:#cfc;"
		 | 5 
		 | June 9
		 |  Atlanta
		 | 
		 | Pierson & Pondexter (17)
		 | Leilani Mitchell (7)
		 | Cappie Pondexter (6)
		 | Prudential Center5933
		 | 3–2
|- style="background:#cfc;"
		 | 6 
		 | June 14
		 |  Connecticut
		 | 
		 | Cappie Pondexter (20)
		 | Kara Braxton (13)
		 | Leilani Mitchell (5)
		 | Prudential Center5845
		 | 4–2
|- style="background:#fcc;"
		 | 7 
		 | June 23
		 |  San Antonio
		 | 
		 | Cappie Pondexter (19)
		 | Cappie Pondexter (11)
		 | Pondexter & Mitchell (6)
		 | Prudential Center6123
		 | 4–3
|- style="background:#fcc;"
		 | 8 
		 | June 26
		 | @ Chicago
		 | 
		 | Cappie Pondexter (21)
		 | Kelsey Bone (9)
		 | Leilani Mitchell (7)
		 | Allstate Arena8911
		 | 4–4
|- style="background:#cfc;"
		 | 9 
		 | June 28
		 | @ Seattle
		 | 
		 | Cappie Pondexter (23)
		 | Kara Braxton (14)
		 | Smith, Braxton, & Pondexter (3)
		 | Key Arena7687
		 | 5–4

|- style="background:#fcc;"
		 | 10 
		 | July 2
		 | @ Phoenix
		 | 
		 | Cappie Pondexter (17)
		 | Kamiko Williams (9)
		 | Alex Montgomery (4)
		 | US Airways Center7636
		 | 5–5
|- style="background:#fcc;"
		 | 11 
		 | July 4
		 | @ Los Angeles
		 | 
		 | Cappie Pondexter (34)
		 | Kelsey Bone (8)
		 | Cappie Pondexter (6)
		 | Staples Center8565
		 | 5–6
|- style="background:#fcc;"
		 | 12 
		 | July 7
		 |  Chicago
		 | 
		 | Cappie Pondexter (18)
		 | Kelsey Bone (8)
		 | Mitchell & Pondexter (4)
		 | Prudential Center7127
		 | 5–7
|- style="background:#cfc;"
		 | 13 
		 | July 9
		 |  Seattle
		 | 
		 | Plenette Pierson (22)
		 | Kara Braxton (11)
		 | Cappie Pondexter (4)
		 | Prudential Center5766
		 | 6–7
|- style="background:#fcc;"
		 | 14 
		 | July 13
		 |  Indiana
		 | 
		 | Plenette Pierson (12)
		 | Alex Montgomery (11)
		 | Bone, Braxton, Pondexter, Montgomery, Williams, & Mitchell (1)
		 | Prudential Center6772
		 | 6–8
|- style="background:#fcc;"
		 | 15 
		 | July 18
		 |  Chicago
		 | 
		 | Pierson & Bone (11)
		 | Kelsey Bone (8)
		 | Alex Montgomery (3)
		 | Prudential Center12858
		 | 6–9
|- style="background:#fcc;"
		 | 16 
		 | July 20
		 | @ Chicago
		 | 
		 | Cappie Pondexter (22)
		 | Plenette Pierson (11)
		 | Pondexter & Mitchell (4)
		 | Allstate Arena6037
		 | 6–10
|- style="background:#cfc;"
		 | 17 
		 | July 23
		 | @ Indiana
		 | 
		 | Cappie Pondexter (24)
		 | Pierson & Montgomery (11)
		 | Plenette Pierson (7)
		 | Bankers Life Fieldhouse7577
		 | 7–10
|- style="background:#fcc;"
		 | 18 
		 | July 25
		 | @ San Antonio
		 | 
		 | Cappie Pondexter (20)
		 | Kara Braxton (7)
		 | Cappie Pondexter (3)
		 | AT&T Center12086
		 | 7–11
|- align="center"
|colspan="9" bgcolor="#bbcaff"|All-Star Break
|- style="background:#cfc;"
		 | 19 
		 | July 31
		 | @ Washington
		 | 
		 | Kara Braxton (22)
		 | Kelsey Bone (11)
		 | Cappie Pondexter (9)
		 | Verizon Center6711
		 | 8–11

|- style="background:#fcc;"
		 | 20 
		 | August 3
		 |  Connecticut
		 | 
		 | Kara Braxton (18)
		 | Kelsey Bone (9)
		 | Cappie Pondexter (5)
		 | Prudential Center6245
		 | 8–12
|- style="background:#cfc;"
		 | 21 
		 | August 6
		 |  Washington
		 | 
		 | Pondexter & Montgomery (21)
		 | Pierson & Bone (6)
		 | Plenette Pierson (10)
		 | Prudential Center8907
		 | 9–12
|- style="background:#fcc;"
		 | 22 
		 | August 10
		 |  Los Angeles
		 | 
		 | Cappie Pondexter (22)
		 | Kara Braxton (9)
		 | Pierson & Braxton (3)
		 | Prudential Center7569
		 | 9–13
|- style="background:#cfc;"
		 | 23 
		 | August 11
		 | @ Atlanta
		 | 
		 | Cappie Pondexter (33)
		 | Plenette Pierson (12)
		 | Cappie Pondexter (7)
		 | Philips Arena4576
		 | 10–13
|- style="background:#fcc;"
		 | 24 
		 | August 16
		 |  Washington
		 | 
		 | Katie Smith (14)
		 | Kara Braxton (9)
		 | Alex Montgomery (5)
		 | Prudential Center6157
		 | 10–14
|- style="background:#fcc;"
		 | 25 
		 | August 18
		 | @ Minnesota
		 | 
		 | Smith & Montgomery (11)
		 | DeLisha Milton-Jones (8)
		 | DeLisha Milton-Jones (5)
		 | Target Center9004
		 | 10–15
|- style="background:#fcc;"
		 | 26 
		 | August 23
		 | @ Chicago
		 | 
		 | Plenette Pierson (25)
		 | Kelsey Bone (7)
		 | Cappie Pondexter (6)
		 | Allstate Arena5888
		 | 10–16
|- style="background:#cfc;"
		 | 27 
		 | August 25
		 | @ Connecticut
		 | 
		 | Plenette Pierson (18)
		 | Kara Braxton (7)
		 | Alex Montgomery (4)
		 | Mohegan Sun Arena7004
		 | 11–16
|- style="background:#fcc;"
		 | 28 
		 | August 27
		 |  Minnesota
		 | 
		 | Cappie Pondexter (13)
		 | DeLisha Milton-Jones (7)
		 | Plenette Pierson (3)
		 | Prudential Center5997
		 | 11–17
|- style="background:#fcc;"
		 | 29 
		 | August 30
		 |  Indiana
		 | 
		 | Kelsey Bone (13)
		 | Alex Montgomery (9)
		 | Pondexter & Mitchell (3)
		 | Prudential Center6621
		 | 11–18

|- style="background:#fcc;"
		 | 30 
		 | September 1
		 | @ Tulsa
		 | 
		 | Braxton & Pondexter (20)
		 | Kara Braxton (15)
		 | Cappie Pondexter (6)
		 | BOK Center5818
		 | 11–19
|- style="background:#fcc;"
		 | 31 
		 | September 6
		 |  Atlanta
		 | 
		 | Kara Braxton (17)
		 | Plenette Pierson (8)
		 | Alex Montgomery (4)
		 | Prudential Center7021
		 | 11–20
|- style="background:#fcc;"
		 | 32 
		 | September 10
		 |  Phoenix
		 | 
		 | Katie Smith (17)
		 | Plenette Pierson (15)
		 | Plenette Pierson (6)
		 | Prudential Center8127
		 | 11–21
|- style="background:#fcc;"
		 | 33 
		 | September 13
		 | @ Indiana
		 | 
		 | DeLisha Milton-Jones (18)
		 | Kara Braxton (8)
		 | Pierson & Montgomery (5)
		 | Bankers Life Fieldhouse10571
		 | 11–22
|- style="background:#fcc;"
		 | 34 
		 | September 15
		 | @ Washington
		 | 
		 | Kelsey Bone (11)
		 | Plenette Pierson (11)
		 | Plenette Pierson (4)
		 | Verizon Center9454
		 | 11–23

Statistics

Regular season

Awards and honors

References

New York Liberty seasons
New York
New York Liberty
2013 in sports in New Jersey